Mateusz Hołownia (born 6 May 1998) is a Polish professional footballer who plays as a defender for Bandırmaspor.

Career
Born in Biała Podlaska, Hołownia started his career with Legia Warsaw. He made his professional debut with the club on 9 July 2014 in the Polish Super Cup against Zawisza Bydgoszcz. He came on as an 89th-minute substitute for Bartosz Bereszyński as Legia lost the cup 3–2. In coming on for Legia, Hołownia became the youngest ever player to appear for the club.

On 29 July he was loaned to Ruch Chorzów. On 7 February 2019, he was then loaned out to Śląsk Wrocław for the rest of the season.

International
Hołownia has appeared for numerous Poland youth international sides.

Career statistics

Honours
Legia Warsaw
Ekstraklasa: 2020–21

References

External links 
 Legia Profile.
 
 
 Profile

1998 births
Living people
People from Biała Podlaska
Association football defenders
Polish footballers
Poland youth international footballers
Legia Warsaw players
Legia Warsaw II players
Ruch Chorzów players
Śląsk Wrocław players
Wisła Kraków players
Bandırmaspor footballers
Ekstraklasa players
I liga players
III liga players
Polish expatriate footballers
Expatriate footballers in Turkey
Polish expatriate sportspeople in Turkey